Sirohi is one of the 200 Legislative Assembly constituencies of Rajasthan state in India. It is in Sirohi district.

Members of the Legislative Assembly 
Source:

Election results

2018

See also
List of constituencies of the Rajasthan Legislative Assembly
Sirohi district

References

Sirohi district
Assembly constituencies of Rajasthan